Meurig is a Welsh name of Brittonic origin and may refer to:

Meurig ap Tewdrig (the son of Tewdrig (St. Tewdrig), and a king of the early Welsh kingdoms of Gwent and Glywysing
Meurig ap Idnerth, king of Buellt, a Welsh kingdom from c. 510 to 545
Meurig (bishop) (died 1161), Welsh cleric, Bishop of Bangor from 1139 to 1161
Meurig Dafydd (c. 1510–95), Welsh bard
Meurig Bowen (born 1965), artistic director of the Cheltenham Music Festival
Meurig Prysor, the bardic name of priest and university educator Maurice Jones

See also
Ystrad Meurig (or Ystradmeurig) is a village in Ceredigion, Wales